Allogaster bicolor is a species of cerambycid from the Achrysonini tribe. They are mainly found in The Democratic Republic of the Congo

References 

Achrysonini
Endemic fauna of the Democratic Republic of the Congo